Harris Huizingh  (born 10 February 1963, in Ter Apel) is a former Dutch footballer.

On 29 April 1984, Huizingh made his debut in the first team for FC Groningen, during a 4–0 victory against Sparta Rotterdam. However, it was not until the season after when he was 22 years old did he get a permanent starting place in the 1985/86 season from trainer Han Berger. Thanks to his good technique, he quickly received the nickname The Wizard of Ter Apel.
He made an impression during his first season, but to the surprise of many, Huizingh left for BV Veendam after that season. Berger's successor, Rob Jacobs, did not think Huizingh was good enough.

After four years in which the club was relegated twice and promoted once, Huizingh signed for FC Groningen again in 1990. That season, the club, with Hans Westerhof as trainer, finished third in the Eredivisie. After the 1990/91 season, Leo Beenhakker wanted to bring Huizingh to Ajax , but Groningen did not want to let him go. They asked for a high transfer fee and Ajax dropped out of the transfer. In the years that followed Huizingh increasingly suffered from injuries.

After the 1998/99 season, Huizingh left Groningen. He was already 36 years old, but was signed by SC Heerenveen who would go on to be runners up until he league. Consequently, a year later, he became the second-oldest player to ever play in the UEFA Champions League.

After two seasons with Heerenveen, Huizingh quit playing football. He would go on to coach many amateur teams in his local region.

References

1963 births
Living people
Dutch footballers
FC Groningen players
SC Veendam players
SC Heerenveen players
People from Westerwolde (municipality)
Association footballers not categorized by position
Footballers from Groningen (province)